Rezek (feminine Rezková) is a Czech surname, a reference to person's red hair. Notable people include:
 Antonín Rezek, Czech historian
 Francisco Rezek, Brazilian judge
 Jakub Rezek, Czech footballer
 Jan Rezek, Czech footballer
 Miloslava Rezková, Czech high jumper
 Ron Rezek, American entrepreneur

Czech-language surnames